The defending champion from 2011 was Izak van der Merwe, as there was no event in 2012. He is not entered in this year's event.
Vasek Pospisil defeated Michał Przysiężny while leading 6–7(7–9), 6–0, 4–1 in the final before Przysiężny retired.

Seeds

Main draw

Finals

Top half

Bottom half

References 
 Main draw
 Qualifying Draw

Soweto Openandnbsp;- Men's Singles
2013 Singles